Kalika is a municipality in Chitwan District in the Narayani Zone of southern Nepal. This municipality was established in 2015 AD by merging the existing Jutpani, Padampur, Shaktikhor and Siddhi VDCs.

Demographics
At the time of the 2011 Nepal census, Kalika Municipality had a population of 44,898. Of these, 60.1% spoke Nepali, 12.3% Chepang, 12.1% Tharu, 10.4% Tamang, 1.3% Magar, 0.8% Maithili, 0.7% Gurung, 0.7% Newar, 0.6% Bote, 0.3% Bhojpuri, 0.2% Darai, 0.1% Ghale and 0.1% other languages as their first language.

In terms of ethnicity/caste, 17.7% were Hill Brahmin, 17.5% Chepang/Praja, 16.1% Tamang, 12.5% Tharu, 9.0% Chhetri, 5.3% Newar, 4.4% Magar, 4.1% Gurung, 3.1% Kami, 2.9% Kumal, 1.8% Damai/Dholi, 0.9% Bote, 0.8% Koiri/Kushwaha, 0.8% Sanyasi/Dasnami, 0.4% Gharti/Bhujel, 0.3% Darai, 0.3% Sarki, 0.3% Sunuwar, 0.3% Thakuri, 0.2% Ghale, 0.2% Musalman, 0.2% Rai, 0.1% Kayastha, 0.1% Majhi, 0.1% Sherpa, 0.1% Sonar and 0.2% others.

In terms of religion, 70.1% were Hindu, 18.1% Buddhist, 9.2% Christian, 0.4% Prakriti, 0.2% Muslim, and 1.9% others.

References 

Chitwan District
Nepal municipalities established in 2015